Ambracia (occasionally , Ampracia) was a city of ancient Greece on the site of modern Arta.

History
Ambracia was founded between 650 and 625 BC by Gorgus, son of the Corinthian tyrant Cypselus, at which time its economy was based on farmlands, fishing, timber for shipbuilding, and the exportation of the produce of Epirus. After the expulsion of Gorgus's son Periander its government developed into a strong democracy.  The early policy of Ambracia was determined by its loyalty to Corinth (for which it probably served as an entrepot in the Epirus trade), and its consequent aversion to Corcyra (as Ambracia participated on the Corinthian side at the Battle of Sybota, which took place in 433 BC between the rebellious Corinthian colony of Corcyra (modern Corfu) and Corinth).

Ambraciot politics featured many frontier disputes with the Amphilochians and Acarnanians.  Hence it took a prominent part in the Peloponnesian War until the crushing defeat at Idomene (426), which crippled its resources.

In the 4th century BC it continued its traditional policy, but in 338 was besieged by Philip II of Macedon. With the assistance of Corinth and Athens, it escaped complete domination at Philip's hands, but was nevertheless forced to accept a Macedonian garrison.  In 294 BC, after forty-three years of semi-autonomy under Macedonian suzerainty, Ambracia was given by the son of Cassander to Pyrrhus, king of Epirus, who made it his capital, and adorned it with palace, temples and theatres.  In the wars of Philip V of Macedon and the Epirotes against the Aetolian League (220–205) Ambracia passed from one alliance to the other, but ultimately joined the latter confederacy.  During the struggle of the Aetolians against Rome, it stood a stubborn siege, including the first known use of poison gas against the Romans' siege tunnels.

Ambracia was captured and plundered by Marcus Fulvius Nobilior in 189 BC, after which it was declared by Rome a "free city", and gradually fell into insignificance.  The foundation by Augustus of Nicopolis, into which the remaining inhabitants were drafted, left the site desolate.  In Byzantine times a new settlement took its place under the name of Arta. Some fragmentary walls of large, well-dressed blocks near this latter town indicate the early prosperity of Ambracia.

Ambraciotes

Artists
Epigonus of Ambracia, 6th BC musician
Nicocles, auletes
Hippasus, tragic actor
Epicrates of Ambracia, c. 4th BC comic poet

Athletes
Sophron, Stadion Olympics 432 BC
Tlasimachus, Tethrippon and Synoris Olympics  296 BC
Andromachus, Stadion Olympics 60 BC

Various
Silanus of Ambracia, 5th BC seer
Cleombrotus of Ambracia, student of Plato

See also
List of cities in ancient Epirus
List of ancient Greek cities

References 

Attribution:

Cities in ancient Epirus
Populated places established in the 7th century BC
Corinthian colonies
Former populated places in Greece
Populated places in ancient Acarnania
Populated places in ancient Epirus
Pyrrhus of Epirus
Archaeological sites in Epirus (region)
Arta, Greece